Mirabai Films is a film production company founded by director Mira Nair.

Selected filmography

External links
Official site

Film production companies of the United States